Kodupulle Mudiyansalage Indrani (born 15 June 1969) is a former Sri Lankan woman cricketer. She has played for Sri Lanka in a solitary WODI as a part of the 2004 Women's Asia Cup.

References

External links 

Profile at CricHQ

1969 births
Living people
Sri Lankan women cricketers
Sri Lanka women One Day International cricketers